Cho Dong-hyun (born on March 12, 1951) is a former South Korean football player.

He was manager of South Korea U-20 in 2007 FIFA U-20 World Cup and then In 2010, he was appointed manager of Korean Police FC.

References

External links

1951 births
Living people
South Korean footballers
South Korean football managers
Korean Police FC (Semi-professional) managers
Ansan Mugunghwa FC managers
Kyung Hee University alumni
Association footballers not categorized by position